Dum is a 2003 Indian Tamil-language action-romantic comedy film directed by A. Venkatesh and written by Puri Jagannadh. The film stars Silambarasan and Rakshitha (in her Tamil debut) while Ashish Vidyarthi and S. S. Rajendran play pivotal roles. It is the Tamil remake of 2002 Kannada film Appu.

Plot 
Satya (Silambarasan) is the son of a police constable. He gets into fights and ends up in jail where his own father gets him out on bail. While he is returning home from a party drunk, a group of college students beat him up. That is when Suchitra (Rakshitha) comes and takes him to the hospital and gives blood. She is the daughter of a police commissioner. Later, Satya falls in love with Suchitra. That leads to several problems which are faced bravely by Satya in the later part of the film. Finally, all goes well, and Satya also receives the letter confirming his selection for IPS.

Cast 

 Silambarasan as Sathya
 Rakshitha as Suchitra
 Ashish Vidyarthi as Thilak
 S. S. Rajendran as IGP
 Delhi Ganesh as Chokkalingam
 Livingston as Boopathi
 Radha Ravi as Inspector
 Sumitra
 Neelima Rani
 Besant Ravi
 Madhan Bob
 Cool Suresh

Production 
The film was initially set to be titled Idiot after the Telugu version, but the title was later changed. A. Venkatesh remade the film from Puri Jagannadh's 2002 Kannada film Appu, which was also remade in Telugu in 2002 as Idiot. Venkatesh was keen to cast Kiran Rathod, but later selected Rakshitha, who appeared in all three versions of the film. During the making of the film, Silambarasan did his own stunts including a risky jump from the fifth floor of a building.

Release 
Dum was an average hit at the box office.

Soundtrack 
There are eight songs composed by Deva, while Sabesh–Murali handled the film's background score. The songs Chanakya, Polladha Padava, Manase are reused from the original Telugu movie Idiot. The song "Chanakya Chanakya" was sampled by Bulgarian pop-folk singer Emilia in her song "Ti si mi". Lyrics written by Pa. Vijay and Kabilan.

References 

2003 films
Tamil remakes of Kannada films
2000s Tamil-language films
2000s masala films
Indian action comedy films
2003 action comedy films
Films directed by A. Venkatesh (director)
2003 comedy films